

The Cameron Skystar or DP series is a family of hot-air airships designed and built in the United Kingdom by Cameron Balloons for recreational and advertising use. The first DP series airship flew in 1986. In the 1990 World Hot-air airships the DP series won 1st, 2nd and 3rd places.

Design and development
The airship has an aluminium gondola with room for a pilot and a passenger, except the smaller DP-50 which only has room for a pilot. The four variants (DP60, DP70, DP80 and DP90) have envelope sizes from 1700m3 to 2548m3. The DP-50, DP-60 and DP-70 use a 570cc Konig Model SD engine, with a Konig 3-bladed propeller in a shroud as standard. The DP80 and DP90 use a Rotax 582UL piston engine with a three-bladed pusher propeller in a shroud. The Konig can also be used on the larger airships and the Rotax on the DP-60 and DP-70 as an option. Each airship is also fitted with two propane tanks for the buoyancy burners.

Variants
Cameron DP-50
The DP-50 has a 50000 cu ft envelope.
Cameron DP-60
The DP-60 has a 60000 cu ft envelope and is 30.48m (100ft) long.
Cameron DP-70
The DP-70 has a 70000 cu ft envelope and is 32.31m (106ft) long.
Cameron DP-80
The DP-80 has an 80000 cu ft envelope and is 33.838m (111ft) long.
Cameron DP-90
The DP-90 has a 90000 cu ft envelope and is 35.05m (115ft) long.

Specification (DP-90)

References

Notes

Bibliography

Airships
Balloons (aeronautics)
Airships of the United Kingdom